is a Japanese footballer who plays for Giravanz Kitakyushu.

Club career statistics
Updated to 1 January 2020.

References

External links
Profile at Giravanz Kitakyushu

1985 births
Living people
Association football people from Fukuoka Prefecture
Japanese footballers
J1 League players
J2 League players
J3 League players
Giravanz Kitakyushu players
FC Gifu players
Kashiwa Reysol players
Yokohama FC players
Matsumoto Yamaga FC players
Association football forwards